The Mixed 4 × 200 metre freestyle relay competition of the 2018 European Aquatics Championships was held on 4 August 2018.

Results

Heats
The heats were started at 10:30.

Final
The final was held at 18:28.

References

Mixed 4 x 200 metre freestyle relay